Doris Lucy Emdin (1905-1967), was a female English international table tennis player.

Table tennis career
After being eliminated in the first round of the singles event of the 1934 World Championships, she reached the quarter-finals of the 1938 World Championships in the same event.

Personal life
Her younger sister Dora Emdin was also a notable table tennis international.

She married Sidney Hearn in 1956 and died in 1967.

See also
 List of table tennis players

References

1905 births
1967 deaths
English female table tennis players